Darlington is a rural locality in the Scenic Rim Region, Queensland, Australia.

Geography
The locality occupies a section of the upper Albert River valley where the river branches in two. Mount Alexander rises in the north east where a series of ridges extend from the Lamington Plateau. Here the upper and steeper slopes remain vegetated. Large areas in the south were the terrain is less rugged have been cleared. In the west the high point along Jinbroken Range forms a border with Hillview and Christmas Creek.

History 
Darlington Provisional School opened on 17 November 1890. On 1 January 1909 it became Darlingon State School. It closed in 1914. On 30 May 1938, a new Darlington State School opened.

Readville Provisional School (also known as Widgee Creek School) opened on 1903. On 1 January  1909 it became a state school. It closed in 1911 due to low student numbers. In April 1918, the school building was relocated to Barney View.

The locality contains 34 households, in which 47.8% of the population are males and 52.2% of the population are females with a median age of 37, 1 year below the national average. The average weekly household income is $1,333, $105 below the national average.

Education 

Darlington State School is a government primary (Prep-6) school for boys and girls at 2744 Kerry Road. In 2018, the school had an enrolment of 30 students with 8 teachers (3 full-time equivalent) and 7 non-teaching staff (2 full-time equivalent).

There are no secondary schools in Darlington. The nearest government secondary school is Beaudesert State High School in Beaudesert to the north.

Attractions
The areas proximity to the Lamington National Park and a landscape typical of a Scenic Rim destination attracts tourists to the area. Darlington Park on Kerry Road is a privately run camping ground.  Several other properties offer bed and breakfast, homestead and cottage accommodation.

See also

Electoral district of Darlington

References

Further reading

 

Scenic Rim Region
Localities in Queensland